Winter Flight is a 1984 British TV movie directed by Roy Battersby, and starring Reece Dinsdale, Nicola Cowper and Sean Bean.

Production
Goldcrest Films invested £581,000 and received £388,000. They had a loss of £193,000.

Another account says the budget was £506,000.

References

External links
Winter Flight at IMDb

Winter Flight at BFI

1984 television films
1984 films
British television films